Kitchener South—Hespeler is a provincial electoral district in Ontario, Canada. It was created in 2015 and has been represented in the Legislative Assembly of Ontario since the 42nd Ontario general election.

Geography
Kitchener South—Hespeler was created from parts of the Kitchener—Conestoga, Kitchener Centre, and Cambridge electoral districts following the passage of the Representation Act, 2015 using the boundaries set out by the 2013 Federal Representation Order.

The new Kitchener South—Hespeler electoral district includes: 
 The portion of the City of Cambridge lying northerly of Ontario Highway 401
 The portion of the City of Kitchener lying: 
 Southerly of the Conestoga Parkway
 Easterly of Fischer-Hallman Road
 Westerly of Ontario Highway 8 between the Conestoga Parkway and Fairway Road
 Westerly of the border between the cities of Cambridge and Kitchener between Fairway Road and Ontario Highway 401

Prominent Places 
Kitchener South - Hespeler is home to several prominent places for the region including: 
 Conestoga College's Doon and Cambridge Campuses 
 McLennan Park
 Huron Natural Area 
 Hespeler Village 
 Chicopee Ski Hill 
 Toyota Manufacturing Plant - major employer for the region 
 Loblaws Distribution Centre - major employer for the region 
 Fairview Park Mall 
 Sportsworld Shopping Centre
 Cambridge Butterfly Conservatory 
 Homer Watson House & Gallery
 Grand Valley Instuition for Women
 Ken Sieling Waterloo Region Museum and Doon Heritage Village

Members of Provincial Parliament

Electoral history

Notes

External links
Map of riding for 2018 election

Ontario provincial electoral districts
Politics of Cambridge, Ontario
Politics of Kitchener, Ontario